Conviction is the debut album of no wave band Ut, released in 1986 by Out Records.

Release and reception

John Dougan of AllMusic gave the album 3 out of 5 stars, calling it "pretty intimidating stuff" and noting that it was "definitely not for the faint of heart".

Track listing
All songs written by Ut

Personnel

UT
Nina Canal – drums, vocals, guitar, piano on "Prehistory"
Jacqui Ham – bass guitar, vocals, guitar, drums
Sally Young – guitar, vocals, bass guitar, drums, piano on "Prehistory"

Additional musicians and production
Denis Blackham – mastering
Charles Bullen – recording assistant
Bill Gilonis – recording assistant
Chris Gray – recording assistant
Tim Hodgkinson – recording, saxophone on "Stain", drums on "Mouse Sleep"
Allison Phillips – drums on "Sick"
Ut – production

References

External links 
 

1986 debut albums
Ut (band) albums